Bernhard Keimer (born 24. August 1964 in Ratingen) is a German physicist and Director at the Max Planck Institute for Solid State Research. His research group uses spectroscopic methods to explore quantum many-body phenomena in correlated-electron materials and metal-oxide heterostructures.

Life 
Keimer obtained his physics education at the Technical University of Munich and at the Massachusetts Institute of Technology, where he received his Ph.D. degree in 1991. He spent a year as postdoctoral associate at Massachusetts Institute of Technology and seven years on the faculty of Princeton University, where he was appointed Full Professor in 1997. In 1998 he was appointed Scientific Member of the Max Planck Society and Director at the Max Planck Institute for Solid State Research. In 2000 he was named Honorary Professor at the University of Stuttgart. He serves as Speaker of the International Max Planck Research School for Condensed Matter Science and Co-Director of the Max Planck Society – University of British Columbia Center for Quantum Materials.

Awards 
 2022 Heike Kamerlingh Onnes Prize
 2011 Gottfried Wilhelm Leibniz Prize of the German Research Foundation
 2010 Elected Fellow, Faculty of Engineering, University of Tokyo
 2006 Elected Member, Heidelberg Academy of Sciences and Humanities
 1996 Alfred P. Sloan Research Fellowship
 1995 David & Lucile Packard Fellowship in Science and Engineering

Publications

External links 
 Homepage at Max Planck Institute for Solid State Research
 International Max Planck Research School for Condensed Matter Science
 Max Planck-UBC Center for Quantum Materials

References 

1964 births
Living people
21st-century German physicists
People from Ratingen
Max Planck Society people
Gottfried Wilhelm Leibniz Prize winners
Technical University of Munich alumni
Massachusetts Institute of Technology alumni
Academic staff of the University of Stuttgart
Princeton University faculty
Max Planck Institute directors